The Colorado Army National Guard is a component of the United States Army, United States National Guard, and Colorado National Guard.  Nationwide, the Army National Guard comprises approximately one half of the US Army's available combat forces and approximately one third of its support organization.  National coordination of various state National Guard units is maintained through the National Guard Bureau.

Colorado Army National Guard units are trained and equipped as part of the United States Army.  The same ranks and insignia are used and National Guardsmen are eligible to receive all United States military awards. The Colorado Guard also bestows a number of state awards for local services rendered in or to the state of Colorado.

The Colorado Army National Guard is composed of over 3500 soldiers, maintaining 30 armories in 24 communities (as of 1999).

Units

The following units are part of the Colorado Army National Guard:
169th Field Artillery Brigade – Buckley AFB, Aurora
3rd Battalion, 157th Field Artillery Regiment – Colorado Springs
Headquarters and Headquarters Battery – Colorado Springs
Battery A – Longmont
Battery B – Aurora
147th Brigade Support Battalion – Fort Collins
3650th Maintenance Company – Firestone
928th Medical Company (Area Support) – Fort Carson
540th Signal Company – Aurora
86th Military Intelligence Company – Aurora
89th Troop Command
5th Battalion, 19th Special Forces Group (Airborne) – Watkins
193d Military Police Battalion (I/R) – Denver
HHC – Denver
220th Military Police Company – Denver
947th Engineer Company – Montrose
1157th Engineer Detachment (Firefighting) – Colorado Springs (inactivation ceremony held on 13 Sep 2019)
2d Battalion (General Support), 135th Aviation Regiment – Buckley AFB, Aurora
HHC 
Company A 
Company E 
Detachment 1, Company B 
Detachment 1, Company G 
131st Maintenance Company (Avionics)
Company D (Medical Evacuation), 3rd Battalion, 140th Aviation Regiment
117th Space Support Battalion  – Colorado Springs
HHC
217th Space Company
1158th Space Company
1st Battalion, 157th Infantry Regiment – Colorado Springs
HHC – Colorado Springs
Company A – Colorado Springs
Company B – Fort Lupton
Company C – Grand Junction
Company D (Weapons Company) – Alamosa
Forward Support Company – Windsor
Special Operations Detachment – Korea (SOD-K) – Buckley AFB, Aurora, CO
168th Regiment, Regional Training Institute (RTI)
Centennial Training Site (CTS)
Basic Leader Course
100th Missile Defense Brigade (Ground-Based Midcourse Defense) Colorado Springs, CO
Colorado Army National Guard Medical Command – Buckley AFB, Aurora, CO
Colorado National Guard Mobilization/Augmentation Element NORAD-USNORTHCOM
Joint Forces Headquarters – Centennial, CO
101st Army Band
104th Public Affairs Detachment
891st Trial Defense Team
8th Civil Support Team

Duties
National Guard units can be mobilized at any time by presidential order to supplement regular armed forces, and upon declaration of a state of emergency by the governor of the state in which they serve. Unlike Army Reserve members, National Guard members cannot be mobilized individually (except through voluntary transfers and Temporary Duty Assignments TDY), but only as part of their respective units. However, there has been a significant number of individual activations to support military operations (2001–?); the legality of this policy is a major issue within the National Guard.

Active Duty Callups
For much of the final decades of the twentieth century, National Guard personnel typically served "One weekend a month, two weeks a year", with a portion working for the Guard in a full-time capacity.  The current forces formation plans of the US Army call for the typical National Guard unit (or National Guardsman) to serve one year of active duty for every three years of service.  More specifically, current Department of Defense policy is that no Guardsman will be involuntarily activated for a total of more than 24 months (cumulative) in one six-year enlistment period (this policy is due to change 1 August 2007, the new policy states that soldiers will be given 24 months between deployments of no more than 24 months, individual states have differing policies).

History

The Colorado Volunteer Militia, predecessor of the Colorado Army National Guard, was originally formed in 1860.  The Militia Act of 1903 organized the various state militias into the present National Guard system.

The Colorado National Guard was involved in the suppression of multiple strikes, including the 1903–1904 Cripple Creek Strike while under the command of General John Chase. During the 1913–1914 United Mine Workers of America strike against the Rockefeller-owned Colorado Fuel and Iron company–an event known as the Colorado Coalfield War–the Guard was deployed in October 1913, again under the command of Chase. The Guard was involved in several violent encounters prior to the 20 April 1914 Ludlow Massacre, in which over a dozen women and children were killed when Guardsmen fired into a tent camp at Ludlow. Following the massacre, the Guard battled strikers throughout Southern Colorado during a 10-Day War.

Originally Colorado was a part of the Southern Department. This was later redesignated, in 1920, as Eighth Corps Area, with headquarters at Fort Sam Houston Texas. In 1941 Colorado was transferred to the new Central Defense Command.

Approximately 300 Colorado ARNG soldiers deployed to Iraq with the 36th Combat Aviation Brigade in September 2006.

On 20 October 2007 the Guard's provisional 193rd Space Battalion became a permanent-status unit, the 117th Space Battalion.

On September 25, 2010, the 1st Battalion, 157th Infantry Regiment was reestablished. By 2018-19, it had become part of the Vermont-based 86th Infantry Brigade Combat Team, consisting of three National Guard mountain battalions.

The Colorado Army National Guard was deployed to Washington, D.C. to avoid another violent riot similar to the one on January 6, when supporters of outgoing President Donald Trump stormed the U.S. Capitol where one Capitol police officer was killed.

Historic units
 1st Colorado Infantry
 137th Field Artillery Battalion (United States)
 142nd Field Artillery Battalion (United States)
 144th Field Artillery Battalion (United States)
 168th Field Artillery Battalion (United States)
 169th Field Artillery Battalion (Colorado)
 183rd Field Artillery Battalion (Colorado)
 193rd Tank Battalion (United states)
 140th Signal Battalion (United States)
 188th Antiaircraft Artillery Battalion (United States)
 199th Engineer Battalion (United States)
 928th Medical Company (Cortez, Colorado)

See also
Colorado State Defense Force

References

 order of battle

External links
Official website
Bibliography of Colorado Army National Guard History compiled by the United States Army Center of Military History
Colorado command insignia

United States Army National Guard by state
Military in Colorado
Arapahoe County, Colorado
Colorado National Guard